The Leprosy Mission is a Christian international NGO. They are the largest and oldest player in the fight against leprosy and are working towards the goal of zero leprosy transmission by 2035. Their vision is 'leprosy defeated, lives transformed'.

As well as working towards zero leprosy transmission, The Leprosy Mission is committed to achieving zero disabilities as a consequence of leprosy and zero leprosy discrimination.

History
In December 1869, Wellesley Bailey, a young Irishman who was working as a teacher in the Punjab in India,: 22  came across a row of huts inhabited by men and women with serious disabilities and physical deformities. A colleague explained that they were suffering from leprosy. Bailey was shocked by what he saw. Afterwards he wrote: "I almost shuddered, yet I was at the same time fascinated, and I felt that if there was ever a Christ-like work in the world it was to go amongst these poor sufferers and bring them the consolation of the gospel.": 23 

On returning to Ireland in 1874, Wellesley Bailey and his wife Alice began to hold meetings in Dublin to tell friends about their experiences of people affected by leprosy in India, and to raise money'.: 27  And so The Leprosy Mission, or The Mission to 'Lepers', as it was known then, was born.

1874-1893 – The Baileys travel extensively in India to see the need of people affected by leprosy and to encourage support work and donations.

1891 – Wellesley Bailey visits Mandalay, Burma, to open the first TLM home for leprosy-affected people outside India.: 43 

1917 – The Mission has extended its work throughout India and the Far East and now has 87 programmes in 12 countries, with support offices in eight countries.: 59 

1930s – TLM began to develop into a medical mission with the vision to help eradicate leprosy.

1940s – In South India, Paul Brand pioneers medical research and reconstructive surgery on leprosy deformities in hands and feet.

1940s-50s – The first effective cure for leprosy, Dapsone, is introduced. Over the next 15 years, millions of patients are successfully treated.: 95 

1950s – The Mission's work is extended into Africa.: 84 

1954 – World Leprosy Day is founded by Raoul Follereau, a French writer, to make sure that people everywhere know that leprosy still exists and is completely curable. It is held each year on the last Sunday in January.

1960s – Leprologists work to discover new drugs that are effective against leprosy as many people are discovered to have Dapsone-resistant leprosy.

1965 – The Mission changes its name from 'The Mission to Lepers' to ‘The Leprosy Mission’ to avoid the negative connotations of the word ‘leper,’ which is now understood to be a derogatory word': 100 

1970s – TLM begins to extend its work to people's homes and communities, rather than just hospitals and asylums.: 107 

1980 – Vincent Barry and his team win the 1980 UNESCO Science Prize for their discovery of anti-leprosy drug clofazimine, developed with the assistance of The Leprosy Mission.

1981 – World Health Organization (WHO) recommends a new combination drug treatment for leprosy, MDT (Multi Drug Therapy). People are cured in as little as six months.

1990s – As many more people are cured, caring for people with lasting disabilities through social, economic, and physical rehabilitation becomes increasingly important.

2011 – The Leprosy Mission moves away from a centrally-directed regional structure and reformulates as a more decentralised Global Fellowship, the Members of which signed the TLM Charter (see below, under 'Where The Leprosy Mission works').

2017 – An ambitious new goal is set: to see no new cases of leprosy by 2035. This goal was agreed upon by the Members of TLM's Global Fellowship.

2019 – A new global strategy is launched with three priorities: 1) Zero leprosy transmission by 2035; 2) Towards zero leprosy disability; 3) Towards zero leprosy discrimination

Areas of operation 
The Leprosy Mission works through a Global Fellowship, composed of Members and Affiliates from 30 different countries.

Members: Australia, Bangladesh, Belgium, Chad, DR Congo, Denmark, England & Wales, Ethiopia, France, Germany, Hungary, India, Mozambique, Myanmar, Nepal, The Netherlands, New Zealand, Northern Ireland, Niger, Nigeria, Papua New Guinea, Scotland, South Korea, Sweden, Switzerland, Sudan, and Timor Leste

Affiliates: Finland, Norway, and Italy

The Global Fellowship came into being in 2011 when The Leprosy Mission Charter was signed. This charter committed all signees to:
 A shared identity, vision, purpose, and values
 Work together in mutual reliance
 Actively add value to the total Fellowship and strengthen its effectiveness
 Work with agreed accountability structures
 Observe financial stewardship principles

The Members of the Global Fellowship are split into countries that implement leprosy work and countries that support leprosy work through fundraising, while some countries do both. The Leprosy Mission's Global Fellowship is supported by an International Office in London, UK. This office operates as a central hub, providing leadership, coordination, facilitation, and operational services.

The Leprosy Mission also works through partners in Tanzania, Sri Lanka, Indonesia, and Thailand.

Activities

Hospitals and healthcare

The Leprosy Mission owns 14 hospitals in India, one in Bangladesh, and one in Nepal. These hospitals are centres of excellence that provide care to leprosy patients, as well as meeting the medical needs of the surrounding communities. The hospitals treat ulcers and leprosy reactions, providing counselling, mental health support, and health education. They also provide reconstructive surgery, physiotherapy, assistive devices, and special footwear. In 2020, 1,110 people underwent reconstructive surgery with The Leprosy Mission. There are mobile prosthetic units in Nigeria and Myanmar that provide medical care to those who have lost their limbs. All of this is designed to enable people affected by leprosy to live independent and productive lives.

The Leprosy Mission supports a number of hospitals in Asia and Africa that are owned by the government or local church.  They also support leprosy control activities across many of the countries in which they work. Leprosy is a curable disease and if cases can be diagnosed and treated early enough, the disabilities associated with leprosy can be avoided.

Training and education

Leprosy is found predominantly in countries where poverty is widespread. To help prevent poverty amongst the leprosy community, The Leprosy Mission provides education to people affected by leprosy, offering formal education and literacy classes.

For school-age children, The Leprosy Mission provides support to help them to stay in school and finish their school education. For adults, The Leprosy Mission offers vocational training, which includes, for example, training in mechanics, computers, agriculture, and printing.

The Leprosy Mission runs training sessions to ensure that general health care workers can recognise early symptoms of leprosy, treat it with Multi-Drug Therapy, and reduce the risk that the disease spreads to others.

There is also leprosy awareness training for the communities with leprosy through which the people learn about the early symptoms of leprosy and understand the importance of seeking out free Multi-Drug Therapy.

Community based rehabilitation

People affected by leprosy are often ostracised by their communities, which prevents them from being able to participate in the economic, social, and political life of the society in which they live.

To tackle this issue, The Leprosy Mission supports community-based rehabilitation programmes across Asia and Africa. This work includes promoting inclusive development, skills training, micro-finance, self-help groups, low-cost housing, self-care groups, and supporting Disabled People's Organisations.

There is, for instance, a “Reducing Leprosy and Increasing Inclusion Programme” in Myanmar that looks to improve the self-help groups for people with disabilities. It also gives medical practitioners and other groups a clearer understanding of leprosy. Similarly, the Inclusive Empowerment project in India provides employment opportunities for people with leprosy. The project also trains them to speak up about their own experiences with leprosy and find their voice within local politics by getting involved in local elections. Through this kind of holistic care, people affected by leprosy are not just cured of leprosy but are also given a chance to live full lives as a part of their communities.

Advocacy

The Leprosy Mission works alongside persons affected by leprosy so that they can advocate for their rights and reduce the physical and social barriers they face. The Mission provides advocacy training for people affected by leprosy so that they can self-advocate. This training ensures that people affected by leprosy know their rights and have the self-confidence to lobby for change at the local and national governmental levels.

The Leprosy Mission has been working with the United Nations to ensure that governments are under pressure to protect the rights of people affected by leprosy. This advocacy is based on the UN Convention on the Rights of Persons with Disabilities (UNCRPD). At the national level, The Leprosy Mission works with national governments to ensure that leprosy receives the appropriate time, attention, and resources. The Leprosy Mission has also been focused on repealing all laws that explicitly discriminate against people affected by leprosy across the world.

Research

The Leprosy Mission conducts research into leprosy that can help to answer many unanswered questions. This includes work to prevent the spread of leprosy, to prevent and treat leprosy reaction, and to understand why some people encounter severe nerve damage despite good treatment. Around 70% of people affected by leprosy may struggle with mental illness (anxiety or depression), so The Leprosy Mission also works to understand the link between leprosy and inner wellbeing,

The research is conducted in the Mycobacterial Research Laboratory in Anandaban Hospital, Nepal, at the Rural Health Programme, Nilphamari, Bangladesh, at the Stanley Browne Laboratory in New Delhi, India, and through TLM’s field projects across Asia and Africa.

Strategy and goals

The Leprosy Mission will continue to reduce the number of new leprosy cases, working toward zero cases by 2035. TLM will further seek ways to understand and reduce leprosy transmission through its extensive research operations. They hope to learn more about giving an early diagnosis, monitoring relapse, and anti-microbial resistance. The Leprosy Mission will also use new technology to support primary and secondary healthcare workers. TLM partners with governments and other leprosy NGOs to conduct active case findings, implement contact tracing alongside the distribution of a post-exposure prophylactic, and raise awareness within targeted communities.
 Moving toward Zero Leprosy Disability

Leprosy is a leading cause of preventable disability, and people are not getting the care they need to treat and prevent leprosy-related disabilities. The Leprosy Mission supports health partners in detecting signs of disability early and providing disability-related services in hospitals and communities, including ulcer care, eye care, and reconstructive surgery.

The wellbeing of persons affected by leprosy is often neglected, and mental illness (particularly depression) is another consequence of leprosy and the stigma that surrounds the disease. The Leprosy Mission is improving its ability to pinpoint signs of mental health problems, support the people affected, and, where necessary, refer them to the right people for professional help.
 Moving towards Zero Discrimination

People with leprosy are often heavily discriminated against due to negative stigma and outdated beliefs about leprosy. Society often overlooks and ignores people affected by leprosy, excluding them from participating in social, public, economic, and cultural life.

The Leprosy Mission supports people affected by leprosy to end discrimination, and it encourages other nation-states to do the same. TLM builds off the Universal Declaration of Human Rights and believes people with leprosy should have the right to an identity, dignity, a sustainable livelihood, essential education and health services, participation in political life, and the right to be heard. TLM will work with communities to make sure those affected by leprosy can share their story, bring resources into their household economy, improve their standing with their community, and feel seen and heard.

References

External links

 
 TLM Belgium
 TLM Denmark
 TLM England & Wales
 TLM France
 TLM Germany
 TLM Hungary
 TLM India
 TLM The Netherlands
 TLM New Zealand
 TLM Northern Ireland
 TLM Nigeria
 TLM Scotland
 TLM Sweden
 TLM Switzerland
 TLM Norway
 TLM Italy

Affiliated institutions of the National Council of Churches in India
Charities based in London
Christian charities based in the United Kingdom
International medical and health organizations
International organisations based in London
Leprosy organizations
London Borough of Hounslow